Arunachal West Lok Sabha constituency is one of the two Lok Sabha (lower house of the Indian Parliament) constituencies in Arunachal Pradesh state in northeastern India. This constituency covers the entire Tawang, West Kameng, East Kameng, Papum Pare, Lower Subansiri, Kurung Kumey, Upper Subansiri and West Siang districts.

Assembly segments
Arunachal West Lok Sabha constituency comprises 33 Assembly segments:

Members of Parliament

Election results

General election 2019

General elections 2014

General election 2009

General elections 2004

See also
List of Constituencies of the Lok Sabha

References

External links
Arunachal West lok sabha  constituency election 2019 date and schedule

Lok Sabha constituencies in Arunachal Pradesh